Vartan Matiossian (Վարդան Մատթէոսեան in Armenian) (born March 6, 1964) is a diasporan Armenian historian, translator and editor. He is currently Executive Director of the Eastern Prelacy of the Armenian Apostolic Church (New York) and book review editor for Armenian Review.

Biography
Matiossian was born in Montevideo, Uruguay on March 6, 1964. He moved to Buenos Aires in 1973. In 1991 he graduated from the School of Economic Sciences of the University of Buenos Aires. From 1992 to 2000, he was associate professor of Armenian History and Religion at the School of Eastern Studies, Universidad del Salvador (Buenos Aires). He has lived in New Jersey, USA since 2000. In 2006 he earned his Ph.D. in history from the National Academy of Sciences of Armenia. He was director of the Armenian National Education Committee (New York) from 2010-2019. His fields of interest cover Armenian history and literature, both ancient and modern. He is an active contributor to the periodical press in Armenian, English, and Spanish.

Selected bibliography

Written
 Կոստան Զարեանի շուրջ (On Gostan Zarian), Antelias (Lebanon): Kevork Melidinetzi Literary Prize, 1998
 Անվերջ վերադարձ. Հայաստանի ճանապարհները (1988-2004) (Eternal Return: the Roads of Armenia, 1988-2004), Yerevan: Zangak-97, 2005
 Հարաւային կողմն աշխարհի. հայերը Լատին Ամերիկայի մէջ սկիզբէն մինչեւ 1950 (The Southern Side of the Earth: Armenians in Latin America from the Beginnings to 1950), Antelias (Lebanon): Richard and Tina Carolan Literary Fund, 2005
 Շամախեցի պարուհին. Արմէն Օհանեանի կեանքն ու գործը (The Dancer of Shamakha: Life and Work of Armen Ohanian), Yerevan: Press of the Museum of Literature and Art, 2007 (coauthored with Artsvi Bakhchinyan)
 Գրական-բանասիրական ուսումնասիրութիւններ (Literary and Philological Studies), Antelias (Lebanon): Kevork Melidinetzi Literary Prize, 2009
 Pasado sin retorno, futuro que espera: los armenios en la Argentina, ayer y hoy, Montevideo: Asociación Cultural Uruguay-Armenia, 2011
 Armenian Language Matters, New York: Armenian National Education Committee, 2019
 The Politics of Naming the Armenian Genocide: Language, History, and 'Medz Yeghern''', London: I. B. Tauris, 2022, 279 pages
 A Woman of the World: Armen Ohanian, the 'Dancer of Shamakha', Fresno: The Press at California State University, 2022 (coauthored with Artsvi Bakhchinyan)

Edited
 Los armenios en América del Sur: Primeras Jornadas de Estudio, Buenos Aires: Instituto de Investigación Armenológica, 1992
 Bedrós Hadjian, El cinturón, translated by Berg Agemian, Buenos Aires: Akian, 2004
 Bedros Hadjian, Հարաւը Սփիւռքի մէջ (The South in the Diaspora), Aleppo: Cilicia Press, 2008
 Gurgen Mahari, Չարենց-նամէ (Յուշեր, յօդուածներ) (Charents-Nameh: Recollections, Articles), compiled by Grigor Achemyan, Yerevan: Bookinist, 2012
 Հայաստանի պատմական ատլաս / Atlas of Historical Armenia, New York: Armenian National Education Committee, 2012
 Կոմիտաս-150 / Gomidas-150, New York: Sis Publications, 2019
 Gurghen Sarkissian, Իմ յուշերը (1914-1921) / My Memoirs, New York: Sis Publications, 2021

Co-edited
 Charents: Poet of the Revolution, Costa Mesa (Ca.): Mazda Press, 2003 (with Marc Nichanian)
 Gurgen Mahari, Երկերի լիակատար ժողովածու (Integral Collection of Works), vol. I-XIV, compiled by Grigor Achemyan, Yerevan: Antares, 2014-2021 (with Arqmenik Nikoghosyan)

Translated
 Sarkís Gulludjian, El arte de vivir, Buenos Aires: n.p., 1985
 Sarkís Gulludjian, La fuente de la luz, Buenos Aires: Shoghag, 1986
 Eghishé Charénts, Libro del camino, Buenos Aires: Avant, 1987, 63 pages
 Bedrós Hadjian, Grandes figuras de la cultura armenia (siglos V-X), Buenos Aires: Armengraf, 1987
 Sarkís Gulludjian, Dos conferencias esclarecedoras, Buenos Aires: Asociación Cultural Armenia Hamazkaín, 1988, 108 pages
 Bedrós Hadjian, Grandes figuras de la cultura armenia (siglos XI-XIII), Buenos Aires: Armengraf, 1990
 Iervant Odian, El camarada Panchuní, Buenos Aires: Armengraf, 1992
 Paruyr Sevak, El árbol solitario, Buenos Aires: Armengraf, 1995
 Bedrós Hadjian, La palabra silenciada: las pérdidas intelectuales del Genocidio Armenio, Buenos Aires: Armengraf, 2001
 Martirós de Yerzinka, Hovhannes Aprakunetzi, Sarguis el Monje, Itinerarios, Yerevan: Academia Linguistica Internacional, 2001, 50 pages (with Vahan Sarkisian)
 Otros tiempos: poesía contemporánea de Armenia, Yerevan: Unión de Escritores de Armenia, 2006
 Bedrós Hadjian, Cien años, cien historias: Armenia y los armenios en el siglo XX, Buenos Aires: Editum, 2007
 George (Kevork) Apelian, No vendas a mi hermanita, mamá (historias de un martirio eterno), Buenos Aires: n.p., 2009
 Artak Movsisian, La meseta sagrada: Armenia en la geografía espiritual del antiguo Medio Oriente, Yerevan: Universidad de Erevan, 2010 (with Ruben Artzruni)
 Artsvi Bakhchinyan, Armenian Cinema-100: The Early History of Armenian Cinema (from 1895 to mid 1920s), Yerevan: Academy of Cinema of Armenia and Union of Armenian Cinematographers, 2012 (with the collaboration of Susanna Mkrtchyan)
 Narrativa armenia contemporánea, Yerevan: Edit Print, 2014, 151 pages
 Հնգամեայ ծրագիր. Հայկական Համայնքներու բաժանմունք 2014-2018, Lisbon: Calouste Gulbenkian Foundation, 2014, pp. 33-67
 Haiganoush Satchian-Grkacharian, Hadjin, If We Forget You..., Glendale: Ars Publishing, 2017, 296 pages
 Hamasdegh, House of Prayer, New York: SIS Publications, 2018, 52 pages
 Vartan Matiossian (ed.), Gomidas-150, New York: SIS Publications, 2019, 109 pages
 Gurghen Sarkissian, Իմ յուշերը (1914-1921) / My Memoirs, New York: Sis Publications, 2021, 177 pages
 Subasta de almas o Armenia arrasada: la historia de Aurora Mardiganian'', Buenos Aires: Ediar, 2022, 310 pages

References

External links
Biography
Vartan Matiossian, Young Scholar, Analyzes Shahan Shahnour's Literary Talents at St. Thomas Gathering

People from Montevideo
Uruguayan people of Armenian descent
Uruguayan emigrants to Argentina
University of Buenos Aires alumni
Ethnic Armenian historians
Living people
1964 births
Uruguayan translators